Illinois Route 92 (IL 92 or Route 92) is an east–west state highway in northwest Illinois. It runs from the Norbert F. Beckey Bridge across the Mississippi River where it meets the eastern end of Iowa Highway 92, east to U.S. Route 34 in La Moille. Illinois Route 92 is part of a continuous  four-state "Highway 92" which begins in Torrington, Wyoming, goes through Nebraska and Iowa and ends in La Moille, Illinois.

Route description 

Illinois Route 92 begins on the Norbert F. Beckey Bridge over the Mississippi River, and first heads eastward across farmland, before intersecting Illinois Route 192, which was a former alignment of Route 92. At the IL 192 junction, IL 92 turns northward and then follows the east bank of the Mississippi through Andalusia; this section is frequently flooded, during which IL 192 is used as a detour. At Andalusia, it serves the Ski Snowstar winter sports park. After Andalusia, it turns northward, becoming the Centennial Expressway, intersecting Interstate 280 and entering Downtown Rock Island.

In Rock Island, the Centennial Expressway ends at a junction with U.S. Route 67, at the east bank end of the Rock Island Centennial Bridge. Route 92 continues eastward on surface streets, paralleling the river, through Downtown Rock Island, Moline, and East Moline, with several parts routed on a pair of one-way streets. In Downtown Moline, it intersects concurrent Interstate 74 and U.S. Route 6 at the east bank end of the I-74 Bridge over the Mississippi. At the border between East Moline and Silvis it intersects Illinois Route 84, with which it is concurrent through Silvis. At a partial cloverleaf interchange with Illinois Route 5 and Illinois Route 84 in Carbon Cliff, Route 92 turns northeast, concurrent with Route 5, as an expressway. At a cloverleaf interchange with Interstate 80, Route 5 ends, and Route 92 continues as a freeway, beginning a concurrency with Interstate 88 and Illinois Route 110 (Chicago-Kansas City Expressway).

It traverses the rich Illinois farmland, crossing the Rock River and the historic Hennepin Canal. It jogs north briefly, concurrent with Illinois Route 78, and passes through the small towns of Walnut and Ohio before ending at a junction with U.S. Route 34 in La Moille.

Major intersections

References

External links

092
Ronald Reagan Trail
092
Transportation in Rock Island County, Illinois
Transportation in Henry County, Illinois
Transportation in Bureau County, Illinois